Ordell Walker is an American football coach. He currently is the head football coach at Urbana High School in Urbana, Illinois, a position he has held since 2017. Walker served as the head football coach at Greenville University in Greenville, Illinois from 2010 to 2012 and Bluefield College in Bluefield, Virginia from 2013 to 2016.

Head coaching record

College

References

Year of birth missing (living people)
Living people
Bluefield Rams football coaches
Greenville Panthers football coaches
High school football coaches in Illinois
Trinity International Trojans football coaches
Trinity International University alumni